Emotion is the debut album by Australian singer Samantha Sang released in 1978. It features her biggest hit "Emotion" (US #3) as well as her follow-up hit, "You Keep Me Dancin'" (US #56).

Barry Gibb produced and sang background vocals on the title track "Emotion", which he also co-wrote, as well as "When Love Is Gone".

Sang covered Eric Carmen's 1978 hit song "Change of Heart"; it was featured as the B-side of "You Keep Me Dancin'". Sang re-recorded her 1970 single "The Love of a Woman", a song written by Barry and Maurice Gibb. Sang also covered "Charade", a song by the Bee Gees from 1974.

Track listing
"You Keep Me Dancing" (Denny Randell, Sandy Linzer) – 2:59
"Charade" (Barry Gibb, Robin Gibb) – 3:29
"Emotion" (Barry Gibb, Robin Gibb) – 3:43
"Change of Heart" (Eric Carmen) – 3:14
"Living Without Your Love" (David Wolfert, Steve Nelson) – 3:51
"La La La - I Love You" (Thom Bell, William Hart) – 3:59
"But If She Moves You" (Arty Simon) – 4:15
"When Love Is Gone" (Francis Lai, Brian Wells, Paul Evans) – 3:46
"I Don't Wanna Go" (Bruce Roberts, Carole Bayer Sager) – 3:33
"The Love of a Woman" (Barry Gibb, Maurice Gibb) – 3:58

Personnel
Samantha Sang – vocals
Barry Gibb –  harmony and background vocals (tracks 3 and 8)
Joey Murcia – guitar (tracks 3 and 8)
George Bitzer – keyboards (tracks 3 and 8)
Harold Cowart – bass (tracks 3 and 8)
Ron Ziegler – drums (tracks 3 and 8)
David Blumber – arranger
James Newton Howard – synthesizer, arranger
Neil Terk – art director, design
Jim Massey – creative director
Al Schmitt – engineer (remix)
Frank Laffitte – photographer
Gary Klein – producer

References

1978 debut albums
Albums produced by Barry Gibb
Albums produced by Gary Klein (producer)
Private Stock Records albums